"Makumba" is a song by Italian singers Noemi and Carl Brave. It was written by Carl Brave, Massimiliano Turi and Mattia Fettina and produced by Carl Brave.

It was released by Sony Music on 4 June 2021 as the second single from the seventh studio album Metamorfosi. "Makumba" peaked at number 4 on the Italian FIMI Singles Chart and was certified platinum in Italy.

Background
The theme of the song deals with a relationship concluded between two lovers who, despite the end of their story, remember with nostalgia, in spite of all those by whom they are envied, towards whom a macumba is superstitiously addressed. Regarding the song and the image of the macumba, Noemi stated: "I am happy to have a light piece like "Makumba" in my repertoire, also because the meeting with Carl Brave was a lot of fun. In this historical period, there is a need to ward off negative vibrations with a wave of optimism. And then, despite its simplicity, "Makumba" allowed me to add additional colors to the color palette of my life".

Music video
The music video for the song was released on YouTube on 17 June 2021, to accompany the single's release. It was directed by Simone Rovellini and was filmed at the beaches of Marina di Ginosa.

Track listing

Charts

Certifications

References

2021 singles
2021 songs
Noemi (singer) songs